The 2017 German Figure Skating Championships was held on December 15–17, 2016 at the Erika-Heß-Eisstadion in Berlin. Skaters competed in the disciplines of men's singles, ladies' singles, pair skating, ice dancing, and synchronized skating on the senior, junior, and novice levels. The results of the national championships were among the criteria used to choose the German teams to the 2017 World Championships and 2017 European Championships.

Medalists

Senior

Junior

Senior results

Men

Ladies

Pairs

Ice dancing

Synchronized

Junior results

Men

Ladies

Pairs

Ice dancing

Synchronized

External links
 2017 German Championships: Senior results at the Deutsche Eislauf Union
 2017 German Junior Championships: Junior, youth, and novice results at the Deutsche Eislauf Union
 2017 German Championships at the Deutsche Eislauf Union

German Championships
German Figure Skating Championships
Figure Skating Championships